Abbas Hariri was an Iranian wrestler. He competed in the men's freestyle middleweight at the 1948 Summer Olympics.

References

External links
 

Year of birth missing
Possibly living people
Iranian male sport wrestlers
Olympic wrestlers of Iran
Wrestlers at the 1948 Summer Olympics
Place of birth missing